Elspeth Duxbury (23 April 190910 March 1967) was a British actress born in Mhow, India.

Known primarily for working in theatre, she had one television role in 1938 but did not make her big screen debut until 1960 in the Terry-Thomas hit comedy Make Mine Mink.

She followed this with a role on Alfred Hitchcock Presents the following year in the episode "I Spy". Concentrating more on theatre, she had two further television roles, one a biography of Alexander Graham Bell and the other in the twice weekly BBC comedy drama series Swizzlewick.

In 1966, she appeared in two films, including the fourth St Trinian's film, The Great St Trinian's Train Robbery.

Her final screen role (and one she had performed on stage) was a televised version of the well known farce Big Bad Mouse with Eric Sykes and Jimmy Edwards.

Elspeth Duxbury was found dead in her room, at the St Martin's Hotel, London, on 10 March 1967 aged 57.

Filmography

1938 Laugh with Me (TV) (as Sophia Kimberley)
1960 Make Mine Mink (as Elizabeth Pinkie Pinkerton)
1961 Alfred Hitchcock Presents (episode I Spy) (TV series) (as Gladys)
1964 Swizzlewick (TV series) (as Miss. Oldacre)
1965 Alexander Graham Bell (TV) (as Mrs. Tweedie)
1966 The Great St Trinian's Train Robbery (as Veronica Bledlow)
1966 The Yellow Hat (as Customer)
1966 Big Bad Mouse (TV) (as Miss Spencer)

External links

Still of Elspeth Duxbury (far left) on the set of Make Mine Mink

1909 births
1967 deaths
British film actresses
British television actresses
British stage actresses
20th-century British actresses
People from Mhow
British people in colonial India